Charles Ernest Thompson (March 7, 1889 – July 16, 1986) was an American politician and jurist. He was a Democratic member of the Mississippi Senate, representing the state's 6th senatorial district, from 1916 to 1920.

Biography 
Charles Edward Thompson was born on March 7, 1889, at Oak Garden Plantation in Franklin County, Mississippi. He was the son of Pharaoh Carter Thompson and Mary Sam (Marshall) Thompson. He had Welsh ancestry.

Thompson was educated under private tutors. He graduated from Mississippi College with a B. S. in 1914. In November 1915, Thompson was elected to represent Mississippi's 6th senatorial district as a Democrat in the Mississippi State Senate. He served in the 1916–1920 term. While still a state senator, he entered the University of Mississippi in 1916 and graduated with a L.L.B. in 1917. He was admitted to the bar the same year. He became a lawyer in McAllen, Texas. From 1931 to 1932, he was a judge of Texas's 93rd district court.

Thompson died on July 16, 1986, in Hidalgo County, Texas, while residing in McAllen.

References 

1889 births
1986 deaths
Democratic Party Mississippi state senators
Mississippi lawyers
Texas lawyers